Croatian Party of Rights 1861 ( or HSP 1861) is a political party in Croatia.

It was founded in 1995 as a splinter party of the Croatian Party of Rights (HSP, itself founded in 1990) following the removal of Croatian nationalist Dobroslav Paraga from party leadership and Paraga's unsuccessful attempts to contest his removal in court. The "1861" in the party's name refers to the year of the foundation of the historic 19th century Party of Rights, which HSP 1861, along with several other modern day nationalist parties, claim lineage to.

The party considers Franjo Tuđman to be a traitor and a dictator - a rare position among rightists in Croatia.

Legislative

References

External links
 

1995 establishments in Croatia
Anti-communist parties
Anti-Serbian sentiment
Croatian nationalist parties
Far-right politics in Croatia
Nationalist parties in Croatia
Political parties established in 1995